The 1992 United States Interregional Soccer League was an American outdoor soccer season run by the United States Interregional Soccer League.

Regular season
 Regulation win = 6 points
 Shootout win (SW) = 4 points
 Shootout loss (SL) = 2 points
 Regulation loss = 0 points
 Bonus points (BP): An additional one point per goal up to a maximum of three points per game.

Southeast Conference

South Central Conference

Southwest Conference

Pacific Conference

Playoffs

First round

Oklahoma City Warriors vs. Dallas Americans

Tucson Amigos vs New Mexico Chiles
 Tucson Amigos defeated New Mexico Chiles: 2-0, 3-1

Atlanta Datagraphis Magic vs Memphis United Express
 Atlanta Datagraphic Magic defeated Memphis United Express: 5-1, 1-0

Second round
 Dallas Rockets defeated Oklahoma City Warriors: 0-2, 3-1, 2-0 (MG)
 Tucson Amigos defeated El Paso Patriots: 1-2 (SO), 2-1
 Atlanta Datagraphic Magic defeated Boca Raton Sabres: 0-2, 3-0
 Palo Alto Firebirds defeated North Bay Breakers: 0-1, 4-2, 2-0 (MG)

Sizzlin' Six

Final

Points leaders

Honors
 Most Valuable Player: Sheldon Lee
 Top Goal Scorer: Efren Rodarte
 Assists leader: Cory Kirkspell
 Coach of the Year: Joe Silviera
 Organization of the Year: Orlando Lions
 All League
Goalkeeper: Vince Da Silva
Defenders: Greg Schwager, Eric Dade, Guillermo McFarlane, Denny Panayi
Midfielders: Craig Huft, Robin Chan, Jim Hutchinson, Roderick Scott
Forwards: John Olu–Molomo, Narciso Zazueta

External links
United Soccer Leagues (RSSSF)
The Year in American Soccer - 1992

USISL outdoor seasons (1989–1994)
2